The 1969 Men's South American Volleyball Championship, the 8th tournament, took place in 1969 in Caracas.

Final positions

Mens South American Volleyball Championship, 1969
Men's South American Volleyball Championships
1969 in South American sport
1969 in Venezuelan sport
International volleyball competitions hosted by Venezuela